"Pop Muzik" is a 1979 song by M, a project by English musician Robin Scott, from the debut album New York • London • Paris • Munich. The single, first released in the UK in early 1979, was bolstered by a music video (directed by Brian Grant) that was well received by critics. The clip featured Scott as a DJ singing into a microphone from behind an exaggerated turntable setup, at times flanked by two female models who sang and danced in a robotic manner. The video also featured Brigit Novik, Scott's wife at the time, who provided the backup vocals for the track.

The single's B-side, "M Factor", was featured in two different versions. The original cut appeared on the first UK and European releases of the single, while a slightly remixed version appeared on the single released in the United States and Canada. "Pop Muzik" reached number 1 on the US Billboard Hot 100, the Australian ARIA Singles Chart, and number 2 in the UK Singles Chart.

Concept and chart performance
The song was initially recorded in R&B and funk styles before a friend of Scott suggested using synthesisers. He describes the genesis of "Pop Muzik":
I was looking to make a fusion of various styles which somehow would summarise the last 25 years of pop music. It was a deliberate point I was trying to make. Whereas rock and roll had created a generation gap, disco was bringing people together on an enormous scale. That's why I really wanted to make a simple, bland statement, which was, 'All we're talking about basically (is) pop music.'

Cash Box described it as a "quirky Euro-pop number," stating that "the nonsensical lyrics create a catchy cadence."  Record World described it as a "totally infectious body-mover."

The single was released in the UK first, peaking at number 2 on 12 May 1979, unable to break Art Garfunkel's 6-week stint at number one with "Bright Eyes". In August of that same year, it was released in North America, where it eventually climbed all the way to number 1 in Canada on 27 October and in the US on 3 November.

Along with Scott, other musicians who played on the track were his brother Julian Scott (on bass), then unknown keyboardist Wally Badarou, Canadian synthesiser programmer John Lewis, drummer Phil Gould (who later became one of the founding members of the group Level 42), Gary Barnacle and Brigit Novik, the backing vocalist, credited as "Brigit Vinchon" on the records and sleeves.

The image of the baby on "Pop Muzik"'s single disc pictures Robin Scott's daughter, Berenice. She is now a singer, piano/keyboard player and composer and involved in projects with her father's friends Phil Gould and Wally Badarou.

Album
The subsequent full-length album New York • London • Paris • Munich was recorded in Montreux, Switzerland, at Queen's Mountain Studio, with lead singer and guitarist Robin Scott and regular engineer David Richards, as well as Julian Scott, Wally Badarou and Brigit Novik.

Additional musicians on the album included drummer Phil Gould, Gary Barnacle on saxophone and flute, and David Bowie (a friend of Scott and a resident of Montreux at the time) who provided occasional handclaps.

The album was also released in the United States on Sire Records with a different track listing but it was not commercially successful, compared to the album's success in Europe.

Other formats
The UK 12-inch single version was notable for the A-side having a double groove so that the two tracks ("Pop Muzik" and "M Factor") both started at the outer edge of the record and finished in the middle (with a long silence at the end of "M Factor" since the track was the shorter of the two). This resulted in a random selection of the two tracks, depending on which groove the needle landed in the lead-in. To further market this idea, the UK record sleeve stated "B side included on A side, full length disco mix of Pop Musik on Seaside". 'Seaside' (in other words "C side") was a simple play on words as the letter C, apart from being the logical next "side" after the A and B sides, is pronounced the same way as the English word "sea".

The song was remixed and re-released in 1989 where it reached number 15 in the UK Singles Charts.

Chart performance

Weekly charts

Year-end charts

Certifications and sales

Formats and track listings

Original 7" single
Original 7" single released by MCA Records and EMI in Europe.
Pop Muzik – 3:21
M Factor – 2:30

Original 7" single with Prize message
Original 7" single released by MCA Records and EMI in Europe, and had a special 'Prize Message' at the end of the A-side which said "It's a Winner!" Presenting the record at the retailer entitled you to a small cash prize/ Free gift.
Pop Muzik – 3:29
M Factor – 2:30

Long version single
Released in both 7" and 12" vinyl single formats in the United States by Sire Records, and as a 12" vinyl in France by Pathé Marconi EMI, all featuring a longer version of the song
Pop Muzik (Long Version) – 4:58
M Factor – 2:30

Netherlands 12" single
12" single released in the Netherlands by MCA Records. The B-side "M Factor" was featured on the A-side of the vinyl on this release, with a remix of the title song on the B-side.
Pop Muzik
M Factor
Pop Muzik (Long Version)

Sweden 7" 1989 release
7" single released in Sweden in 1989 by Freestyle Records
Pop Muzik (Edited 1989 Remix) – 3:10
Pop Muzik (Original 7" Version) – 3:20

Sweden 12" 1989 release
12" single released in Sweden in 1989 by Freestyle Records
Pop Muzik (Extended 1989 Hip Hop Remix) – 5:40
Pop Muzik (7" Version) – 3:20
Pop Muzik (Edited 1989 Dub Remix) – 3:20
Pop Muzik (Original 12" Version) – 5:00
Pop Muzik (Edited 1989 Remix) – 3:10

Germany 12" 1989 release
12" single released in Germany in 1989 by ZYX Records
Pop Muzik (The Hip Hop Club Remix) – 5:38
Pop Muzik (The Hip Hop Remix) – 3:20
Pop Muzik (Original '79 Mix) – 3:21

Germany CD 2001 release
CD single released in Germany in 2001 by ZYX Records
Pop Muzik (Britannia '89 Remix) – 3:11
Pop Muzik (Cabinet Remix) – 7:38
Pop Muzik (Original Version) – 3:21

Cover versions
Male vocal and instrumental band All Systems Go entered the UK Singles Chart on 18 June 1988. It reached number 63, and remained in the chart for 2 weeks.
In 1997, U2 remixed the song to use as the opening track for their PopMart Tour. The remix features an upbeat tempo and use of synthesizers. In the live version, Robin Scott's vocals were used. The song was released on the "Last Night on Earth" single and Bono's vocals replaced Scott's. The only part of the song Bono added was the line "dance to the PopMart, top of the food chain." Andrew Unterberger of Stylus Magazine said the cover was "hardly the most musically accomplished thing U2 did in this period, but I can't think of a better choice to introduce this period of their career."

See also
List of Billboard Hot 100 number-one singles of 1979
List of European number-one hits of 1979
List of number-one singles in Australia during the 1970s
List of number-one singles of 1979 (Canada)
List of number-one hits of 1979 (Germany)
List of number-one singles and albums in Sweden
List of number-one singles from 1968 to 1979 (Switzerland)
List of RPM number-one dance singles of 1979

References

External links

1979 songs
1979 singles
1988 singles
1989 singles
2001 singles
Billboard Hot 100 number-one singles
British new wave songs
British synth-pop songs
British disco songs
EMI Records singles
European Hot 100 Singles number-one singles
MCA Records singles
Number-one singles in Australia
Number-one singles in Denmark
Number-one singles in Germany
Number-one singles in South Africa
Number-one singles in Sweden
Number-one singles in Switzerland
RPM Top Singles number-one singles
Sire Records singles
Songs about pop music
U2 songs